To Whom It May Concern is the debut album by the British R&B/pop group the Pasadenas, released in 1988. The album contains three UK top 40 hits: "Tribute (Right On)" (No. 5), "Riding on a Train" (No. 13), and "Enchanted Lady" (No. 31). "Tribute (Right On)" also reached No. 52 on the US Billboard Hot 100.

Critical reception

Spin called the album "less tightly footnoted than the Fine Young Cannibals, but also less charismatic." The Washington Post wrote: "A smooth, pleasant but not especially involving pop-soul platter, this is zipless funk, airbrushed for maximum crossover potential. As with much Britsoul, this is less soul music than it is music about soul music." The New York Times wrote that it "harks back to ultrasmooth vocal-harmony groups of the 70's like the Spinners and Earth, Wind and Fire, but lacks memorable melodies."

Track listing

Personnel
The Pasadenas (Andrew Banfield, Aaron Brown, David Milliner, Michael Milliner, Hamish Seelochan) – vocals
Prince Sampson – guitar
Julian Crampton – bass
Walter Cardew – drums
Martin Virgo, Pete Wingfield, Phil Ramacon, Robyn Smith – keyboards
Harry Morgan – percussion
Horace Cardew – saxophone
Vince Sullivan – trombone
Damon Brown, Pete Cooper – trumpet

Singles
"Tribute (Right On)" – 1988
"Riding on a Train" – 1988
"Enchanted Lady" – 1988

Charts

References

External links
To Whom It May Concern at Discogs

1988 debut albums
Columbia Records albums
The Pasadenas albums